Sebők Balázs (born 14 December 1994 in Budapest) is a Hungarian professional ice hockey forward who plays for KalPa in the Liiga.

He is fluent in Finnish.

References

External links

1994 births
Living people
Hungarian expatriates in Finland
Hungarian ice hockey forwards
KalPa players
Ice hockey people from Budapest